Fissurella fischeri is a species of sea snail, a marine gastropod mollusk in the family Fissurellidae, the keyhole limpets.

Description
The size of the shell attains 9.5 mm.

Distribution
This marine species occurs off the Cape Verdes.

References

  Salvat, F., 1967. Campagne de la Calypso aux Iles du Cap Vert (1959). 8. Mollusques. Introduction. - Fissurellidae. Annales de l'Institut Océanographique 45(2): 19-31

Fissurellidae
Gastropods described in 1967